Karl-Heinz Kunkel (4 September 1926 – 18 July 1994) was a German footballer who played for the Saarland national team as a forward.

References

1926 births
1994 deaths
German footballers
Saar footballers
Saarland international footballers
Association football forwards